Svetlana Evgenievna Lyapina is a Soviet figure skating coach and former ice dancer. With partner Georgi "Gorsha" Sur, she won two medals at the World Junior Championships for the Soviet Union. As a coach, she coached Australian ice dancers Portia Rigby and Francis Rigby, as well as many others in Australia.

She is the mother of Russian ice dancer Jonathan Guerreiro.

Competitive highlights 
(with Sur)

References 

Living people
Russian figure skating coaches
Soviet female ice dancers
World Junior Figure Skating Championships medalists
Female sports coaches
Universiade medalists in figure skating
Year of birth missing (living people)
Universiade gold medalists for the Soviet Union
Universiade bronze medalists for the Soviet Union
Competitors at the 1987 Winter Universiade
Competitors at the 1989 Winter Universiade